Trường Sa is an island district of Khánh Hòa province in the South Central Coast region of Vietnam. It was established on the basis of the Spratly Islands (except Louisa Reef, Luconia Shoals and James Shoal), which is also claimed wholly or in part by Brunei, China, Malaysia, the Philippines and Taiwan. According to the 2009 census, the district has a population of 195 people.

Geography

As the islands contain a large number of scattered geographic entities, the district is divided into eight clusters including Song Tử, Thị Tứ, Loại Ta, Nam Yết, Sinh Tồn, Trường Sa, Thám Hiểm and Bình Nguyên by Vietnam.

Administrative history in the 20th century
 By the early 1930s, France had claimed the Spratly Islands. On 21 December 1933, Cochinchina's governor Jean-Félix Krautheimer signed Decree No. 4702-CP annexing Spratly Island, Amboyna Cay, Itu Aba Island, Northeast Cay, Southwest Cay, Thitu Island, Loaita Island and subsidiary islands into Bà Rịa province.
 On 22 October 1956, Republic of Vietnam's President Ngô Đình Diệm signed Decree No. 143-NV renaming provinces of South Vietnam. According to this decree, Bà Rịa–Vũng Tàu was renamed to Phước Tuy province under which the Spratly Islands was administered.
 On 6 September 1973, the Republic of Vietnam's Ministry of the Interior signed Decree No. 420-BNV/HCĐP/26 merging Spratly Island, Amboyna Cay, Itu Aba Island, Northeast Cay, Southwest Cay, Loaita Island, Thitu Island, Namyit Island, Sin Cowe Island and the surrounding islands into Phước Hải Commune, Đất Đỏ district, Phước Tuy province.
 On 9 December 1982, the Council of Ministers of the Socialist Republic of Vietnam issued Decision No. 193/HĐBT establishing Trường Sa District as an administrative unit of Đồng Nai Province. On December 28, 1982, The Seventh National Assembly decided to incorporate Trường Sa District into Phú Khánh Province.
 On 1 July 1989, the National Assembly split Phú Khánh Province into Phú Yên province and Khánh Hòa province. Trường Sa district has been under the direct administration of Khánh Hòa since then.

Administration
According to Decree No. 65/2007/NĐ-CP of 11 April 2007 issued by the Government of the Socialist Republic of Vietnam, Trường Sa district has three administrative units including one commune-level town (Trường Sa) and two rural communes (Song Tử Tây and Sinh Tồn).

 Trường Sa Township was established on the basis of Trường Sa Island (Spratly Island) and surrounding islands, reefs and banks.
 Song Tử Tây Commune was established on the basis of Song Tử Tây island (Southwest Cay) and surrounding islands, reefs and banks.
 Sinh Tồn Commune was established on the basis of Sinh Tồn Island (Sin Cowe Island) and surrounding islands, reefs and banks.

In reality, Trường Sa district is effectively administering only 21 islets and reefs of the Spratly Islands:

See also
 Kalayaan, Palawan, Philippines
 Sansha, Hainan, China
 Johnson South Reef Skirmish

Notes

References

Districts of Khánh Hòa province
Spratly Islands